Anna Walton (born 18 December 1980) is an English actress known for her roles in Vampire Diary, Mutant Chronicles, and the compassionate Princess Nuala in Hellboy II: The Golden Army.

Walton began working as a model while still at Queenswood School in Hertfordshire and later trained in acting at the Oxford School of Drama, from which she graduated in 2004.

Walton appeared on NBC's Crusoe.

Walton's brother, Henry, was guitarist for the band Zulu Winter.  She appeared in a music video for the band's hit single, "Silver Tongue".

Filmography

References

External links

English film actresses
Alumni of the Oxford School of Drama
1980 births
Living people
Actresses from Hertfordshire